Lenche Andreevska (born 13 August 1992) is a Macedonian football midfielder currently playing for Kamenica Sasa in the Macedonian Championship. She has played the Champions League with ZFK Shkiponjat, ZFK Tikvesanka, Borec Veles and ZFK Naše Taksi.

She is a member of the Macedonian national team. As a junior international she played the 2010 U-19 European Championship.

References

1992 births
Living people
Women's association football midfielders
Macedonian women's footballers
North Macedonia women's international footballers
ŽFK Kamenica Sasa players